Zygmunt Marek "Muniek" Staszczyk (born November 5, 1963 in Częstochowa) is a Polish vocalist, founder, bandleader, and initially also bassist of T.Love. He was also one of two producers of I Hate Rock'n'Roll, the 2006 T.Love album. He cooperated with many Polish artists and bands such as Maanam, Kasia Nosowska, Krzysztof Krawczyk, Pidzama Porno, and Habakuk.

Biography
Born in Częstochowa, in Raków workers district.

Finished the general education secondary school in Czestochowa (IV L.O. - he had written a song about this school)

Before he set up T.Love he was playing in Atak (the name was later changed to Opozycja). In later times he was singing in Paul Pavique Movement, Szwagierkolaska ane Rege Inna Polish Stylee.

Muniek Staszczyk is married to Marta and has a son Jan (born 1990) and a daughter Maria (ur. 1993).

Discography

Studio albums

Live albums

Singles

Video albums

Music videos

References

External links

 Official site of T.Love

1963 births
Living people
Polish record producers
Polish pop singers
Polish rock singers
Polish Roman Catholics
Polish lyricists
20th-century Polish male singers
21st-century Polish male singers
21st-century Polish singers